Toledo Municipality may refer to:
 Toledo Municipality, Oruro, Bolivia
 Toledo, Norte de Santander, Colombia

Municipality name disambiguation pages